Wadia Ghandy & Co., is one of the oldest law firms of India. It was founded on 28 November 1883 with an office in what was then Bombay. It currently holds offices at Ahmedabad, Delhi, Mumbai, Pune. While it is a full service firm with partners across practice areas, it has well recognised and market leading litigation, real estate, aviation and banking teams.

History
The law firm was started by Framji Rustomji Wadia and Jiwaji Dinshaw Ghandy in the 1880s. The firm's "managing clerk," Ardeshir Jamshedji Chanji Mistry published memoirs of its history in 1911 and 1925, along with memoirs of the Bombay High Court in 1925. These remain rare and valuable "primary source" accounts of the everyday life of the firm and Indian legal profession at the turn of the twentieth century. Despite losing one of their senior partners Anand Bhatt in the 2008 Mumbai terrorist attack, the firm has continued to prosper. Nihar Modi(Gujrati surname), once a partner at Wadia Ghandy & co, has gone on to found Platinum Partners.

Structure
The firm is a partnership firm with various partners for each office. For offices other than the Mumbai office, there is a junior resident partner and the partners of Mumbai have cross-partnerships in such local offices.
Currently the position of managing partner of the firm is shared between Ashish Ahuja and Dhawal Mehta.

Articleship programme
The firm is well known for its article-ship training programme which is similar to the one followed in U.K (Solicitor trainee). It is a three-year programme whereby an articled clerk is assigned to a department for a year and rotated at the end of each year (Conveyancing, Corporate, Litigation; not in particular order) and thereby providing holistic training. the firm follows three round process in selecting articled clerks wherein the first round consists of shortlisting candidates on the basis of their C.V., selected candidates then proceed to the second round which consists of personal interview with the head of H.R and then the candidates selected from the second round proceed to the third round which consists of personal interview with a senior partner.

References 

Law firms of India
Law firms established in 1883